Paolo Guzzanti (born 1 August 1940) is an Italian journalist and politician. He was previously a member of the Italian Socialist Party.

Biography
Born in Rome, he is the nephew of Elio Guzzanti and father to actors Corrado, Sabina and Caterina.

As a journalist he worked for L'Avanti!, La Repubblica (of which he was co-founder) and La Stampa. He also hosted the first season of TV show Chi l'ha visto?. Currently he is an editorialist of Paolo Berlusconi's Il Giornale (he was deputy director before and for Panorama, also owned by Berlusconi).

He was elected to the Italian Parliament for Forza Italia. From 2002 to 2006 he was president of the Mitrokhin Commission, a parliamentary commission which was entrusted with investigating the role of KGB in Italy. The commission, since the very beginning, received heavy criticism as it was pointed out that its main role seemed only that to discredit the former Italian Communist Party. According to an interview of former KGB agent Yevgeny Limarev published in La Repubblica, Italian left-wing politicians to be discredited included Romano Prodi, Massimo D'Alema and Alfonso Pecoraro Scanio. The commission was closed in 2006 without results.

On 1 December 2006 Mario Scaramella, a contact of former KGB/FSB officer Alexander Litvinenko, tested positive for Polonium-210. Mr Scaramella was involved in an Italian parliamentary inquiry into KGB activity and was sufficiently worried by the contents of an e-mail to ask for advice from Mr Litvinenko. The e-mail said that he, Mr Litvinenko and an Italian senator, Paolo Guzzanti, were possible targets for assassination.

In 2009 Paolo Guzzanti published a book where he stated that Litvinenko told the Mitrokhin Commission about a connection between Romano Prodi and Soviet KGB, post-Soviet FSB. He believed that Litvinenko was killed because of Mitrokhin Commission and that Vladimir Putin had an interest in ruining the commission.

On 2 February 2009 he left People of Freedom and joined Italian liberal party. He was elected deputy secretary on 20 February.

References

1940 births
Living people
Politicians from Rome
Italian Socialist Party politicians
Forza Italia politicians
Italian Liberal Party (1997) politicians
Senators of Legislature XIV of Italy
Senators of Legislature XV of Italy
Deputies of Legislature XVI of Italy
Italian television journalists
Italian magazine editors
La Repubblica people